Veliki prezir (The great contempt) is an eponymous album by the Serbian alternative rock band Veliki Prezir, released by Metropolis records in 1996. Initially being available on compact cassette only, the album, with the Kanda, Kodža i Nebojša debut album Guarda Toma! was rereleased as on CD as a split album in 2001.

Track listing 
All music and lyrics by Vladimir Kolarić.

Personnel

Veliki Prezir 
 Vladimir Kolarić — guitar, vocals
 Slavko Kontra — guitar
 Predrag Ilčešin — bass
 Dušan Kuzmanović — drums

Additional personnel 
 Ivana Gordić — backing vocals on "Minnesota"
 Milan Jovanović — artwork by [design]
 Velja Mijanović — engineer [postproduction]
 Zoran Petrović "Petrija" — percussion [tambourine]
 Veliki Prezir — producer
 Aleksandar Stamenković "Stamena" — programmed by [emulator], recorded by, producer
 Predrag Pejić "Pedja" — recorded by, producer

References 
 Veliki prezir at Discogs
 EX YU ROCK enciklopedija 1960-2006, Janjatović Petar; 

1996 debut albums
Veliki Prezir albums